Erika Monroe Williams (also known as Erika Monroe and Erika Williams) is a US television news anchor and show host.

Life and work 
A native of Southern California, Monroe Williams started as a news anchor in Lubbock, Texas, as the main anchor and health reporter for Fox affiliate KJTV-TV. While there, she won first and second place in the Texas Media Awards.

After KJTV, Monroe Williams moved to Phoenix, Arizona to become the weekend anchor of the TV shows Good Evening Arizona and The News Show at 3TV (KTVK).

Monroe Williams began working in entertainment public relations with the newly formed firm, Huvane Baum Halls. She worked daily with celebrity clients, including Gwyneth Paltrow, Russell Crowe, Jennifer Aniston and Antonio Banderas.

In 2007, she hosted the Arizona Diamondbacks' pre-game show alongside her husband, five-time All-Star Third Baseman and 2001 World Series Champion Matt Williams.

She was a contestant on the ABC show The Taste on Team Nigella in 2013. She was eliminated during the February 12th episode, placing 14th.

Personal life 
Matt Williams and Erika Monroe were married in 2003. They have one child together, Madi Monroe, and live in Paradise Valley, Arizona.

References

External links 
 The Hopeless Housewife, Monroe-Williams' cooking and lifestyle website

 Erika Monroe-Williams on KTVK
 Erika Monroe-Williams on KTVK 3TV

Living people
Year of birth missing (living people)
American television news anchors
Reality cooking competition contestants